College of Santa Cruz may refer to:
Colegio de Santa Cruz de Tlatelolco
College of Santa Cruz de Querétaro